The Kho or Bakhu is a traditional dress worn bland
Bhutia, ethnic Sikkimese people of Sikkim and Nepal. It is a loose, cloak-style garment that is fastened at the neck on one side and near the waist with a silk or cotton belt similar to the Tibetan chuba and to the Ngalop gho of Bhutan, but sleeveless.

Women wear a silken, full-sleeve blouse called a honju inside the kho; a loose gown type garment fastened near the waist, tightened with a belt. Married women tie a multi-coloured striped apron of woolen cloth called pangden around their waist.

See also 
 Gho
 Chuba
 Kira (Bhutan)
 Khada

References

External links

 University of Hawaii Museum. Sikkim - Woman's Informal Ensemble. (dress worn by Hope Cooke in the 1960s, on Flickr).

Nepalese culture
Culture of Sikkim
Tibetan clothing
Nepalese clothing
Sherpa culture